Shamshabad Assembly constituency is one of the 230 Vidhan Sabha (Legislative Assembly) constituencies of Madhya Pradesh state in central India. This constituency came into existence in 1977, as one of the Vidhan Sabha constituencies of Madhya Pradesh state.

Overview
Shamshabad (constituency number 148) is one of the 5 Vidhan Sabha constituencies located in Vidisha district. This constituency presently covers the entire Shamshabad tehsil of the district with 93 villages, Nateran tehsil's 96 villages and Vidisha tehsil's 107 villages. It has total 220 polling booths. Total Voters in the constituency are 1,68,314.

Shamshabad is part of Sagar Lok Sabha constituency along with seven other Vidhan Sabha segments, namely Bina, Khurai, Surkhi, Naryoli and Sagar in this district and Kurwai, Sironj in Vidisha district.

Members of Legislative Assembly
 1977: Girischand Ramsahay, JNP
 1980: Brijmohandas Maheshwari, Bharatiya Janata Party
 1985: Mertab Singh, Indian National Congress (I)
 1990: Prem Narayan, Bharatiya Janata Party
 1993: Pram Narayan Sharma, Bharatiya Janata Party
 1998: Rudrapratap Singh, AJBP
 2003: Raghavji, Bharatiya Janata Party
 2008: Surya Prakash Meena, Bharatiya Janata Party
 2013: Surya Prakash Meena, Bharatiya Janata Party
 2018: Rajshree Singh, Bharatiya Janata Party

References

Vidisha district
Assembly constituencies of Madhya Pradesh